Johannes "John" Cantine (October 20, 1735 – April 30, 1808) was an American politician.

Born in Marbletown, New York, Cantine served in both houses of the New York Legislature. Cantine also served in the New York state convention concerning the ratification of the United States Constitution. In 1801, Cantine was elected as a Federalist to the United States House of Representatives, for the New York Seventh Congressional District, but declined to take the office. His son was Moses I. Cantine.

See also
List of members-elect of the United States House of Representatives who never took their seats

Notes

1735 births
1808 deaths
Members of the New York State Assembly
New York (state) state senators
People from Marbletown, New York